"God's Gonna Cut You Down" (also known as "God Almighty's Gonna Cut You Down", "God's Gonna Cut 'Em Down", "Run On" and "Sermon") is a traditional American folk song. It was first recorded by the Golden Gate Quartet in 1946 and first issued in 1947 by the Jubalaires.  Since then, the track has been recorded in a variety of genres, including country, folk, alternative rock, electronic and black metal. The lyrics warn evildoers that they cannot avoid God's eventual judgment.

As "God's Gonna Cut You Down", it was performed by Odetta on Odetta Sings Ballads and Blues (1956), Johnny Cash on the posthumously released American V: A Hundred Highways (2006). Marilyn Manson also used this title for a non-album single in 2019. As "Run On", it has been recorded by Elvis Presley and Tom Jones, and The Blind Boys of Alabama.  The song has been covered by many other artists. A version by Bill Landford & the Landfordaires from 1949 was later sampled heavily for the 1999 song "Run On" by Moby.

Johnny Cash version 

Johnny Cash recorded a version of "God's Gonna Cut You Down" on American V: A Hundred Highways in 2003, with an arrangement quite different from most known gospel versions of the song. As of January 2016, this version of the song sold 672,000 copies in the United States.

A music video, directed by Tony Kaye, was made for this version in late 2006, three years after Cash's death. The video was shot entirely in black and white and features a number of celebrities: David Allan Coe, Patricia Arquette, Travis Barker, Peter Blake, Bono, Sheryl Crow, Johnny Depp, the Dixie Chicks (now known as The Chicks), Flea, Billy Gibbons, Whoopi Goldberg, Woody Harrelson, Dennis Hopper, Terrence Howard, Jay-Z, Mick Jones, Kid Rock, Anthony Kiedis, Kris Kristofferson, Amy Lee, Tommy Lee, Adam Levine, Shelby Lynne, Chris Martin, Kate Moss, Graham Nash, Iggy Pop, Lisa Marie Presley, Q-Tip, Corinne Bailey Rae, Keith Richards, Chris Rock, Rick Rubin, Patti Smith, Sharon Stone, Justin Timberlake, Kanye West, Brian Wilson, and Owen Wilson.

This version has appeared in the Fox series Gotham, during the episode titled "What the Little Bird Told Him". It also featured in the season three episode of NBC series The Blacklist, "The Director: Conclusion", and in the CBC series Republic of Doyle, where it closed episode 10 of season 2, "The Special Detective".

The song is currently being used by Houston Astros refief pitcher Ryan Pressly as entrance music. It has been used by St. Louis Cardinals relief pitcher Andrew Miller, Los Angeles Angels relief pitcher Cody Allen, as well as Kansas City Royals closer Brad Boxberger as entrance music. In Independent baseball, Tyler Nordgren of the Ottawa Champions also uses this song as his walk-up song.

The song is featured in the single-player campaign of Battlefield 3, and a version of Cash's performance that was remixed by Ninja Tracks is used in the Gamescom gameplay trailer for Battlefield 1.

The song is also used in the Tom Clancy's Splinter Cell: Conviction launch trailer, and in the initial trailer for the 2010 Coen brothers remake of True Grit.

The "Mondkopf Plus de Sommeil" remix of Cash's performance appeared in an ad campaign for the 2011 Jeep Grand Cherokee (WK2).

The song is also used in the Frostpunk official release date trailer, "Serenity".

Charts

Marilyn Manson version

Marilyn Manson recorded a cover version of the track during sessions for their tenth studio album, Heaven Upside Down, which was released in 2017. They performed the song live several times during that album's supporting concert tour. Their studio version of the track first appeared on the Ethan Hawke film 24 Hours to Live, the soundtrack of which was issued via Varèse Sarabande on December 8, 2017. The song was then released as a standalone digital download and streaming single on October 18, 2019, in tandem with a tour by the band. A vinyl picture disc was released on December 13, 2019, and limited to 3,000 copies worldwide. The vinyl single features one of Manson's watercolor paintings as its artwork.

A music video directed by Tim Mattia, who previously directed the video for the Born Villain track "Hey, Cruel World...", was filmed in Joshua Tree, California and was also released on October 18. The track peaked at number eight on Hot Rock Songs and at number one on Rock Digital Songs—the band's highest peak on either chart.

Charts

Other recordings
 The song was first recorded by Golden Gate Quartet on June 5, 1946, under the title "God's Gonna Cut You Down", and first released later that year by The Jubalaires, under the title "God Almighty's Gonna Cut You Down".
 Bill Landford and the Landfordairs recorded the track under the title "Run On for a Long Time" (2:34) on December 15, 1949, in Memphis, Tennessee.
 American singer and civil rights activist Odetta recorded the song as "God's Gonna Cut You Down" in the style of a 19th-century revival meeting preaching hymn, for her 1957 album Odetta Sings Ballads and Blues.
 Bobbie Gentry issued a version of the song, under the title "Sermon", on her 1968 album The Delta Sweete.
 The vocals of the Bill Landford version were sampled by American electronica musician Moby for "Run On", a single from his fifth studio album Play in 1999.
 The Blind Boys Of Alabama recorded a version in 2001 for Spirit Of The Century.
 A version of "Run On" by Elvis Presley appeared on his 1967 album, How Great Thou Art.
 Tom Jones recorded "Run On" for his 2010 album Praise & Blame.
 Kevin Lovatt's version of "God's Gonna Cut You Down" was featured during the closing credits of the 2016 film The Hollow Point.
Mercury Rev re-recorded Gentry's The Delta Sweete album in 2019; their version of "Sermon" featured vocals by Margo Price.
German singer Nina Hagen recorded "Run On" for her 2010 album Personal Jesus.
The American rock guitarist Blues Saraceno recorded Run on for a long time in 2016.
 Australian singer David McCormack's version plays during the titles that open the television series Jack Irish, starring Guy Pearce.
 The Gaslight Anthem recorded it on the 2008 tribute album All Aboard : A Tribute to Johnny Cash
 PJ Harvey and Tim Phillips recorded a version for their soundtrack to the 2022 Apple TV+ show Bad Sisters.
Jamie Campbell Bower, actor and musician, released Run On in 2022, in collaboration with King Sugar.
 John Grant recorded a version for the title song of the 2022 BBC show Inside Man.

References

External links
Johnny Cash - God's Gonna Cut You Down on YouTube
Lyrics – "God's Gonna Cut You Down" (Johnny Cash cover)

2006 singles
Johnny Cash songs
2019 singles
Marilyn Manson (band) songs
Elvis Presley songs
Gospel songs
Grammy Award for Best Short Form Music Video
1946 songs
American folk songs
Anonymous musical compositions
Songwriter unknown